Lide Erbina Araña (born 19 December 2000 in Ordizia) is a Basque rugby player from Gipuzkoa. She plays rugby union, and rugby sevens, for the Spain women's national rugby sevens team. She competed at the 2018–19 World Rugby Women's Sevens Series. In 2019, she received the World Rugby Women’s Sevens Series Rookie of the Year award.

Career 
She started playing with the Ordizia RE and made her debut with the Spanish national team. In 2018, she was signed by the CR Cisneros, in the same team as his sister Amaia Erbina . In 2021, she was signed by Eibar RT.

In 2020, she played in a friendly match against Scotland.

References

External links 
 

Living people
2000 births

Spanish rugby sevens players